Douglas College is the largest public degree-granting college institution in British Columbia, Canada. Close to 17,000 credit students, 8,500 continuing education students and 4,210 international students are enrolled here. Douglas College offers bachelor's degrees and general university arts and science courses, as well as career programs in health care, human services, business and the creative arts.

History
Founded in 1970, the college is named after the former Governor of British Columbia, Sir James Douglas. In 1981, Kwantlen College split off from Douglas College.

Coat of Arms 
Douglas College's coat of arms was revealed to the public on January 21, 2020. The emblem was designed by Coast Salish artist Carrielynn Victor for the college's 50th anniversary. The emblem was the first to be completely designed by an Indigenous artist in Canada's history. The heart in the middle of the emblem is a reference to the college's motto, "Do what you love." The crown on top of it is made of cedar, which is a wood material that is local to the area. There is a raven on top of the crest, meant to signify cleverness as the bird represents. There are also two Douglas fir trees surrounding the raven which are meant to signify a relation to the college's name. In the Coast Salish language, below the shield, are the words "Excellence, Knowledge, Passion". The reference to the Indigenous language is a recognition that the college operates on a First Nations territory.

Campuses
The college has two major campuses in Metro Vancouver – one in New Westminster (Royal Avenue and Anvil Tower) and one in Coquitlam. The college also has a smaller Training Centre campus in Surrey.

Programs
Douglas offers bachelor's degrees, associated degrees, and various programs, certifications and diplomas.

International education
Each year, more than 4,000 international students from 92 countries take for-credit courses at Douglas College, accounting for roughly 18 percent of the student population.

Media
The student newspaper, The Other Press, has been in print since 1976, making it one of British Columbia's oldest continuously run student publications. It is a member of Canadian University Press.

The college also publishes Event, a literary magazine published three times per year.

Athletics
Varsity sports teams at Douglas College are known as the Royals and the mascot is a lion named Roary. The Royals compete in men's and women's basketball, curling, golf, soccer and volleyball as well as men's baseball and women's softball. The Royals are members of the Canadian Collegiate Athletic Association (CCAA), the Pacific Western Athletic Association (PACWEST) and the Northwest Athletic Conference (NWAC).

Controversy
In January 2012, Global's 16x9 news magazine aired a story alleging large scale fraud at Douglas College's Chinese partner campuses. Some faculty members complained that some Chinese students were unable to speak basic English upon graduation. They alleged mass-scale fraud whereby students were guaranteed to pass their courses through various methods such as black market answer sheets, progressively easier make-up exams, and grade tampering. Robert Buller, a former Dean of Commerce and Business alleged Douglas College President Scott McAlpine said "he needed plausible deniability and he wanted to see and hear nothing" when approached about the issue. Since then, Douglas College and the British Columbia Ministry of Advanced Education completed an independent review of the situation and issued a report. Although the report found "no evidence of academic dishonesty or fraud in the conduct of Douglas College", it noted specific areas of concerns including in lack of oversight in the use of challenge exams. The report stated that "Douglas College would have benefitted from speedier and more thoroughly considered responses" to issues previously identified.

Notable alumni 

 Adrian Holmes, actor 
 Daniel Igali, Olympic gold medalist wrestler
 Elizabeth Bachinsky, poet
 Farhan Lalji, sports reporter
 Frank Giustra, businessman and philanthropist
 Lance Ryan, opera vocalist
 N. Robin Crossby, game designer
 Sky Lee, author
 Terry Glavin, author and journalist

See also
 The Other Press
 List of colleges and universities named after people
 Douglass College, similarly titled but different college part of Rutgers University

References

External links
Douglas College
Douglas 360°

1970 establishments in British Columbia
Buildings and structures in Coquitlam
Education in Coquitlam
Education in Surrey, British Columbia
Education in New Westminster
Educational institutions established in 1970
Universities and colleges in Greater Vancouver
Colleges in British Columbia
Vocational education in Canada